Ángela Vázquez Espinoza (born January 17, 2001) is a Mexican singer. She is best known for being the lead vocalist of the pop trio Vázquez Sounds.

Career 
Vázquez first gained notoriety at the age of 10 years old. After her band, the Vázquez Sounds, uploaded the video of their cover for "Rolling in the Deep", a song originally performed by British singer Adele, in late 2011. The video went viral and the group became an internet sensation in Mexico and in other Spanish-speaking countries.

She provided the vocals for the three albums with the Vázquez Sounds, Vázquez Sounds (2012), Invencible (2014) and Sweet Christmas Ukulele & Jazz (2015).

Albums

With the Vázquez Sounds

Solo

Singles 
Over the years, Vázquez has provided the vocals for several music covers that have been released as singles, and she has also released several original songs.

 2011: "Rolling in the Deep" (originally performed by Adele)
 2011: "All I Want for Christmas Is You" (originally performed by Mariah Carey)
 2012: "Forget You" (originally performed by Cee Lo Green)
 2012: "The Show" (originally performed by Lenka)
 2012: "I Want You Back" (originally performed by The Jackson Five)
 2012: "Let It Be" (originally performed by The Beatles)
 2012: "Skyscraper" (originally performed by Demi Lovato)
 2013: "Time After Time" (originally performed by Cyndi Lauper)
 2013: "Next to Me" (originally performed by Emeli Sandé)
 2013: "Complicated" (originally performed by Avril Lavigne)
 2013: "Blowin' in the Wind" (originally performed by Bob Dylan)
 2014: "Te soñaré" (original song)
 2014: "Me voy, me voy" (original song)
 2014: "Volaré" (original song)
 2014: "Invencible" (original song)
 2014: "En mí, no en ti" (original song)
 2015: "Riptide" (originally performed by Vance Joy)
 2015: "Buenos Dias Señor Sol" (originally performed by Juan Gabriel)
 2016: "Dreams" (originally performed by Fleetwood Mac)
 2017: "Te Encontré" (original song)
 2017: "Julio" (original song)
 2018: "Volverte a ver" (original song)
 2019: "What a Feeling" (originally performed by Irene Cara)
 2022: "Recuerdo" (original song)
 2022: "Si Te Vas" (original song)
 2022: "Hoy Te Quiero Ver" (original song)
 2022: "En Libertad" (original song)
 2023: "Primer Amor" (original song)

References 

2001 births
Latin pop singers
Mexican women singers
Mexican women pop singers
Mexican child singers
Singers from Baja California
People from Mexicali
Mexican Internet celebrities
Living people